Thomas Morgan may refer to:

Military
 Sir Thomas Morgan, 1st Baronet (1604–1679), general of the English Civil War
 Thomas Morgan (navy chaplain) (1769–1851), navy chaplain during the French Revolutionary Wars and chaplain of Portsmouth Dockyard
 Thomas R. Morgan (born 1930), general in the US Marine Corps

Politics
 Thomas Morgan (MP died 1565), MP for Monmouthshire
 Thomas Morgan (died 1595) (1542–1595), MP for Shaftesbury and Wilton
 Thomas Morgan (MP died 1603), MP for Monmouthshire
 Thomas Morgan (died 1645), MP for Wilton
 Sir Thomas Morgan, 3rd Baronet (1684–1716), Member of Parliament for Herefordshire, 1712–1716
 Thomas E. Morgan (1906–1995), U.S. Representative from Pennsylvania
 Thomas Morgan (judge advocate) (1702–1769), Member of Parliament for Brecon, 1723–1734, Monmouthshire, 1734–1747, and Breconshire, 1747–1769
 Thomas Morgan (of Dderw) (1664–1700), Member of Parliament for Brecon, 1689–1690 and 1698–1700, Monmouthshire, 1690–1700
 Thomas Morgan (of Rhiwpera) (1727–1771), Member of Parliament for Brecon, 1754–1763, and Monmouthshire, 1763–1771
 Thomas Morgan (of Machen) (c. 1589–1664/6), English politician who sat in the House of Commons in 1654
 Thomas Morgan (of Llantarnam) (1546–1606), confidant and spy of Mary Stuart, Queen of Scots
 Thomas J. Morgan (1847–1912), English-born American labor leader and socialist political activist

Other
 Thomas Morgan (deist) (died 1743), Welsh philosopher
 Thomas Charles Morgan (1783–1843), English physician and writer
 Thomas Morgan (Afanwyson) (1850–1939), Welsh writer, historian and Baptist minister
 Thomas Hunt Morgan (1866–1945), American geneticist and embryologist
 Thomas Morgan (bishop) (born 1941), retired bishop of the Anglican Church of Canada
 Thomas Morgan (footballer) (born 1977), former Irish footballer
 Thomas Morgan (bassist) (born 1981), American jazz bassist
 Thomas Henry Morgan (1857–1940), architect in the U.S. state of Georgia

See also
 Tom Morgan (disambiguation)